Zhang Fenglin (born 10 March 1993) is a Chinese swimmer. He competed for China at the 2012 Summer Olympics.

See also
China at the 2012 Summer Olympics - Swimming

References

1993 births
Living people
Chinese male swimmers
Swimmers at the 2012 Summer Olympics
Olympic swimmers of China
Swimmers from Qingdao
Asian Games medalists in swimming
Swimmers at the 2010 Asian Games
Asian Games silver medalists for China
Medalists at the 2010 Asian Games